Steve or Steven or Stephen Dickson may refer to:

Steve Dickson (born 1962), Australian politician
Stephen Dickson (1951–1991), American singer
Stephen Dickson (executive), American aviation executive and former FAA administrator

See also
Stephen Dixon (disambiguation)